Jo Piazza is an American journalist, editor, and author of seven books. She has written and reported for The Wall Street Journal, New York Daily News, The New York Times, and Slate.

Career 
She was senior digital editor at Current TV. She returned to celebrity news as the Executive News Director for the print and digital editions of In Touch Weekly and Life & Style magazines. Most recently Piazza served as managing editor for Yahoo! Travel.

Works 
 Celebrity, Inc
 Love Rehab New York : Open Road Media, 2013. , 
 If Nuns Ruled the World New York : Open Road Integrated Media, 2014. , 
 The Knockoff Anchor Books 2016. , 
 How to be Married New York : Harmony Books, 2017. , 
 Fitness Junkie New York : Doubleday, 2017. , 
 Charlotte Walsh likes to win : a novel , New York : Simon & Schuster, 2018. ,

References 

Living people
Year of birth missing (living people)
American women novelists
Place of birth missing (living people)
American women journalists
American editors
21st-century American journalists
21st-century American novelists
21st-century American women writers